Arnold is a small town in the Australian state of Victoria. It is located on Bridgewater - Dunolly Road, in the Shire of Loddon.  The town was originally named Kangadaar, however the creek crossing below the town was Arnold Bridge (privately owned toll bridge) which the town mistakenly became known as.  The post office opened on 17 December 1888 as Arnold's Bridge, and was renamed Arnold Railway Station in 1909 and Arnold in 1924, and closed in 1989.

The main recreational facility in the town is the Arnold Recreation Centre (The A.R.C) which is home to the cricket team the Arnold Redbacks.

References

Towns in Victoria (Australia)
Shire of Loddon